The Urburschenschaft was the first  Burschenschaft, one traditional form  of  German student fraternities.

It was founded in 1815 in Jena, Thuringia, in Germany. As colours, following their initial use in a state flag by the elder Reuss noble line in 1778 but having no known connections to that event, the Urburschenschaft adopted Black-Red-Gold, later to become the National colours of Germany. Many founding members of the Jena Burschenschaft had been fighting in the Lützow Free Corps during the Wars of Liberation. The uniforms of the Royal Prussian Free Corps von Lützow were black, with red trim, and golden coloured brass buttons.

The Jena Urburschenschaft had 859 active students as members, about 60 per cent of all the students  at the university of Jena from 1815 to 1820. 
One of its first members was Heinrich von Gagern, the president of the Frankfurt Parliament in 1848/49.

At other German universities Burschenschaften were founded in the early 19th century as associations of university students inspired by the ideals of the Urburschenschaft, liberal and nationalistic ideas.

References

Student societies in Germany
University of Jena
Organisations based in Thuringia
1815 establishments in Germany

sv:Burschenschaft